"Stupid Cupid" is a song written by Howard Greenfield and Neil Sedaka which became a hit for Connie Francis in 1958.

Recording history
After almost three years of failure, Connie Francis finally had a hit in the spring of 1958 with a rock ballad version of the standard "Who's Sorry Now?" Unfortunately, her next pair of singles were less successful. I'm Sorry I Made You Cry only reached #36 on the  Billboard Hot 100 and Heartaches failed to chart at all. Francis recalls: "I knew I had to come up with a hit on the third record. It was crucial. I listened to every publisher's song in New York, but nothing was hitting me." Eventually Don Kirshner of Aldon Music had Greenfield and Sedaka, who were staff writers for Aldon, visited Francis at her home to pitch their songs, but she and close friend Bobby Darin argued that the slow, dense ballads they were offering didn't appeal to the teenager market. Francis asked if they had something faster and bouncier.  Greenfield asked Sedaka to play "Stupid Cupid", an uptempo number intended for the Shepherd Sisters. Sedaka objected that Francis, a "classy lady," would be insulted to be pitched such a puerile song; but Greenfield dismissed Sedaka's objection, saying, "What have we got to lose, she hates everything we wrote, doesn't she? Play it already!" After hearing only a few lines Francis recalls: "I started jumping up and down and I said, 'That's it! You guys got my next record!'"

Francis cut "Stupid Cupid" on 18 June 1958 at Metropolitan Studio (NYC); LeRoy Holmes conducted the orchestra while Morty Kraft produced the session. Noteworthy in the recording is the uncredited bass guitar work; a complex and energetic riff that has survived the decades and has proven to be one of early rock and roll's best recorded bass guitar sessions. A version of "Carolina Moon" recorded at Metropolitan Studio that 9 June with Kraft producing and Joe Lipman conducting was utilized as the B-side. "Stupid Cupid" provided a reasonably strong comeback vehicle for Francis reaching the Top 15 that August with a Billboard Hot 100 peak of #14. Francis would have to wait until 1959 to make her return to the Top 10 with "My Happiness".

In the UK Singles Chart Francis had made more chart impact than in the US with both "Who's Sorry Now?" (No. 1) and "I'm Sorry I Made You Cry" (No. 11). This trend continued with "Stupid Cupid" which, as a double sided hit with "Carolina Moon", spent six weeks at No. 1. Francis would remain a potent UK chart force for the next four years with fifteen Top Twenty singles, eight of them Top Ten, but she would never again reach the top of the UK Singles Chart despite topping the US charts three times in the early 1960s.

Neil Sedaka, one of the song's co-writers, recorded his own version in 1959, and it saw a single release in Italy on the RCA Italiana label.

Other versions
Patsy Cline sang the song on stage. The song is featured on her posthumous albums Live Volume 2 and Live at the Cimarron Ballroom.

Maureen Evans made her first known recording with a 1958 cover of "Stupid Cupid"/ "Carolina Moon" cut for the Embassy label which produced soundalike versions of current hits for Woolworths to sell at lower price than the original hit.  Queen included "Stupid Cupid" in the rock 'n' roll medleys in their live shows during the 1970s, including the concert released on Live at the Rainbow '74.

In 1982, Taiwanese singer Fong Fei-fei released a version of the song which she entitled "Another Kind of Confession" (另一種表白).

"Stupid Cupid" has also been recorded by Wanda Jackson, by Jo Wyatt (of Minipops) whose 1982 version reached #1 in France and #45 in the Netherlands, and by Mandy Moore for The Princess Diaries soundtrack, and in the motion picture, for her character Lana Thomas sings. Danny Mann (de) recorded the German language rendering "Sexie Hexy" in 1958 while the Portuguese rendering: "Estúpido Cupido", recorded by Brazilian singer Celly Campello, was the #1 single in Brazil for the year 1959. Arja Koriseva featured a Finnish rendering of "Stupid Cupid": "Tuttu juttu", on her 1990 self-titled album.

In 2003, Jordan McCoy performed the song on American Juniors.

The song was included in the Korean musical drama What's Up!, released in 2011.  Kim Ji-won's character Park Tae Yi performed the song as she told Lim Ju-hwan's character the story of how her parents met.  The song recurs several times more throughout the remainder of the episodes.

The song is also a part of North America's version of Donkey Konga, released for the Nintendo GameCube in 2003-2004.

See also
List of UK Singles Chart number ones of the 1950s

References

1958 singles
Disney songs
UK Singles Chart number-one singles
Connie Francis songs
Neil Sedaka songs
Mandy Moore songs
Songs written by Neil Sedaka
Songs with lyrics by Howard Greenfield
1958 songs
RCA Records singles
Brill Building songs
Cupid in music